Kajetanów may refer to the following places:
Kajetanów, Łódź Voivodeship (central Poland)
Kajetanów, Lublin County in Lublin Voivodeship (east Poland)
Kajetanów, Puławy County in Lublin Voivodeship (east Poland)
Kajetanów, Świętokrzyskie Voivodeship (south-central Poland)
Kajetanów, Masovian Voivodeship (east-central Poland)